Gol Ali (also Romanized as Gol ‘Ālī; also known as Gol‘āleh) is a village in Chaybasar-e Shomali Rural District, Bazargan District, Maku County, West Azerbaijan Province, Iran. At the 2006 census, its population was 186, in 38 families.

References 

Populated places in Maku County